Wujiagang District is a district of the city of Yichang, Hubei, People's Republic of China.

Administrative divisions
Four subdistricts:
Dagongqiao Subdistrict, Wanshouqiao Subdistrict, Baotahe Subdistrict, Wujiagang Subdistrict

The only township is Wujia Township

References

County-level divisions of Hubei
Geography of Yichang